Suk Qazqan (also Romanized as Sūk Qazqān and Sūk-e Qazqān; also known as Sūk, Sūke-e Qazqan, Sukhegāzgaon, Sūkhgākūn, and Sūk Qarqān) is a village in Chahar Cheshmeh Rural District, Kamareh District, Khomeyn County, Markazi Province, Iran. At the 2006 census, its population was 604, in 139 families.

References 

Populated places in Khomeyn County